The Logie Award for Most Popular Actress is an award presented annually at the Australian TV Week Logie Awards. The award recognises the popularity of an actress in an Australian program. Commonly known as the Silver Logie for Best Actress, it has undergone several official changes of name. It was first awarded at the 19th Annual TV Week Logie Awards, held in 1977 when the award was originally called Most Popular Australian Lead Actress. It was later renamed Most Popular Actress and briefly Best Actress (2016–2017). For the 2018 ceremony, the award category name was reverted to Most Popular Actress.

The winner and nominees of Most Popular Actress are chosen by the public through an online voting survey on the TV Week website. Lisa McCune and Asher Keddie hold the record for the most wins, with five each, followed by Georgie Parker with four wins.

Winners and nominees

Multiple wins

Programs with most awards

References

Awards established in 1977

Awards for actresses